NGC 4506 is a spiral galaxy located around 50 million light-years away in the constellation Coma Berenices. It is classified as peculiar due to the presence of dust that surrounds its nucleus. NGC 4506 was discovered by astronomer William Herschel on January 14, 1787. It is a member of the Virgo Cluster.

See also
 List of NGC objects (4001–5000)

References

External links

Coma Berenices
Spiral galaxies
Peculiar galaxies
4506
41546
7682
Astronomical objects discovered in 1787
Virgo Cluster
Discoveries by William Herschel